Ahead of the Curve is a 2020 American biographical documentary film co-produced and co-directed by Jen Rainin and Rivkah Beth Medow, with music composed by Meshell Ndegeocello. The film is based on the true story of Franco Stevens, one of the most influential women in lesbian history, and the founding publisher of Curve Magazine, a leading international lesbian lifestyle magazine. Portraying themselves in the film are, Franco Stevens, Kim Katrin, Denice Frohman, Amber Hikes, Andrea Pino-Silva, Melissa Etheridge and Jewelle Gomez. The documentary premiered in June 2020 at the San Francisco International LGBTQ+ Film Festival.

Synopsis
The film tells the story about the founder of Curve Magazine, and its rise in the 1990s and its uncertain future today. When Franco was 23 years old, she funded the magazine with a bunch of credit cards. She took the borrowed money from the cards to the race track, where her bets resulted in her continual winning, and that's how Curve was born. During her tenure at the magazine, she helped build a foundation for many movements being led by today's activists in the face of threats to the LGBT community. Now, decades later, her legacy faces extinction and she reassesses her life after a disabling injury, and sets out to communicate and understand the work in LGBT visibility being led by the queer women of today.

Cast
 Franco Stevens as self
 Kim Katrin as self
 Denice Frohman as self
 Amber Hikes as self
 Andrea Pino-Silva as self
 Melissa Etheridge as self
 Jewelle Gomez as self
 Lea DeLaria as self
 Kate Kendell as self

Production notes
Jen Rainin said she originally thought of the film as a drama, but changed her mind after doing the research. Rainin revealed that she was having a hard time finding stories about the women "who really got our movement to this place where we are now", but she still hopes to make the narrative version one day. She also stated there is "a responsibility to tell the story. We just don’t know where we came from, where our legacy is, what our lineage is."

Critical reception

The consensus among the many reviews is positive. The Austin Chronicle said the film "functions as a historical document...there are contemporary interviews with 'celesbians' both of today and yore, of course, but the doc strikes gold in its incorporation of Stevens' personal archives of queer life in the Nineties". The Spool stated the documentary "is destined to become one of those documentaries queer people can turn to in order to remember where we’ve been and how we’ve arrived here together". Andrew Parker wrote in his review for The Gate that, "the documentary is...balanced, historically significant, and [is] surprisingly entertaining...Jen Rainin and co-director Rivkah Beth Medow deftly illustrate and underline the importance of visibility and representation".

Sarah Boslaugh of NewFest said Rainin's cheerful documentary...accomplishes several things at once...it's a history of the groundbreaking lesbian magazine Curve...it's a profile of the magazine's founder...whose nerve, positive attitude, and sense of self are enough to lift anyone's day...and it's a cultural history of lesbians and other gender nonconforming women in the United States from the 1980s to the present". FilmInk praised the film saying it is "told with humor, intelligence and an abundance of personality". The Hollywood Reporter said the film "is by no means flashy, but it’s a handsome production that zips along...and maintains an earned sense of celebration and cheer". The film has  approval rating at review aggregator Rotten Tomatoes, based on  reviews.

Accolades
aGLIFF, All Genders, Lifestyles, and Identities Film Festival - Audience award for Best Documentary (2020)
Image+Nation, LGBTQueer Montreal - Grand Prix du Jury (2020)
Reeling: The Chicago LGBTQ+ International Film Festival - Audience award for Best Documentary (2020) 
Tampa International Gay and Lesbian Film Festival - Audience award for Best Documentary (2020)
Connecticut LGBTQ Film Festival - Audience award for Best Documentary (2020)
Outfest - Official selection (2020)
NewFest: The New York Lesbian, Gay, Bisexual, & Transgender Film Festival - Official selection (2020)
San Francisco International LGBTQ+ Film Festival - World premiere (2020)

See also

 List of female film and television directors
 List of lesbian filmmakers
 List of LGBT-related films directed by women

References

External links
 
 
Ahead of the Curve at Official website

2020 films
2020 documentary films
2020 LGBT-related films
American documentary films
American LGBT-related films
Documentary films about LGBT culture
Biographical films about LGBT people
2020s English-language films
Lesbian-related films
LGBT-related films based on actual events
2020s American films